Aegirine is a member of the clinopyroxene group of inosilicate minerals. Aegirine is the sodium endmember of the aegirine-augite series. Aegirine has the chemical formula NaFeSi2O6 in which the iron is present as Fe3+. In the aegirine-augite series the sodium is variably replaced by calcium with iron(II) and magnesium replacing the iron(III) to balance the charge. Aluminium also substitutes for the iron(III). Acmite is a fibrous, green-colored variety.

Aegirine occurs as dark green monoclinic prismatic crystals. It has a glassy luster and perfect cleavage. Its Mohs hardness varies from 5 to 6, and its specific gravity is between 3.2 and 3.4.

This mineral commonly occurs in alkalic igneous rocks, nepheline syenites, carbonatites and pegmatites. It also appears in regionally
metamorphosed schists, gneisses, and iron formations; in blueschist facies rocks, and from sodium metasomatism in granulites. It may occur as an authigenic mineral in shales and marls. It occurs in association with potassic feldspar, nepheline, riebeckite, arfvedsonite, aenigmatite, astrophyllite, catapleiite, eudialyte, serandite and apophyllite.

Localities include Mont Saint-Hilaire, Quebec, Canada; Kongsberg, Norway; Narsarssuk, Greenland; Kola Peninsula, Russia; Magnet Cove, Arkansas, US; Kenya; Scotland and Nigeria.

The acmite variety was first described in 1821, at Kongsberg, Norway, and the aegirine variety in 1835 for an occurrence in Rundemyr, Øvre Eiker, Buskerud, Norway. Aegirine was named after Ægir, the Norse god of the sea. A synonym for the mineral is acmite (from Greek ἀκμή "point, edge") in reference to the typical pointed crystals.

It is sometimes used as a gemstone.

See also
 List of minerals

References

External links
 Mineral Galleries

Inosilicates
Sodium minerals
Iron(III) minerals
Pyroxene group
Monoclinic minerals
Minerals in space group 15
Gemstones
Minerals described in 1821